Hampa Nagarajaiah (born 7 October 1936), popularly known by his pen name Hampanā, is an Indian scholar in Kannada language and Jainism. He was born at Hampasandra Village located in Gowribidanur taluk, Chikkaballapura District in the Indian state of Karnataka. Hampanā is married to Kamala Hampana who also a veteran littérateur.

Academics
Hampanā completed his early education at his native village and neighbouring towns such as Gowribidanur, Madhugiri, Tumkur and Mandya. Later he moved to Maharaja's College, Mysore from where he did his graduation in BA (Honours) and completed his post-graduation in Kannada under the intellectual inspiration of Kuvempu, T. N. Srikantaiah, D. L. Narasimhachar, S.V. Parameshwara Bhatta, K Venkataramappa, Javaregowda at University of Mysore in 1959. He was soon appointed as lecturer in Kannada and served at Mysore Maharani's Arts and Commerce College for Women, Mysore, Sahyadri Science College of Shimoga and Government College at Mandya, DRM Science College at Davanagere and Govt. Arts & Science College at Bengaluru. Meanwhile, he acquired PhD from Bangalore University for A Comprehensive study of Vaddaradhane.

Lectures
Hampanā has delivered guest lectures on Jainism at universities in UK, Germany and United States. He has also delivered lectures on linguistics, poetics and Jain literature at Bengaluru University, Mysore University, Mangalore University, Karnataka University, Kuvempu University, Mumbai University, Madras University and Madhurai Kamaraj University.

Administrator
He served in capacities like professor and dean of arts faculty in Bengaluru University. He also officiated as Director of Jain Research Centre, Director of Institute of Jain Studies, and Director of Department of Kannada and Culture in Government of Karnataka before retiring in 1996.

He also served as an honorary secretary of the Kannada Literary Chair called Kannada Sahitya Parishat from 1966 to 1974 and was elected as its president for three terms during 1978–1986. During his tenure he has published about 300 books in Kannada authored by scholars. When UNESCO declared 1979 as International Year of the Child he published through KaSaPa, 200 books for children written by different writers. He is the man behind erecting a building to commemorate the Golden Jubilee of KaSaPa in the premise of Kannada Saahithya Parishath.
He is a visiting professor in many Universities and is serving as an honorary member of the advisory committee at London University, England and Florida International University, US.

Felicitation volumes
His students and admirers with due respect and love have offered him several felicitation volumes on different occasions. All these are filled with articles on scholastic importance. They can be listed as,
 Pachethene (in 1983) Ed: T K Mahamood and S M Krishnaraya
 Samkriti (in 1988) Ed: D. H J Lakkappa Gowda and Prof. Sukanya Maruthi
 Samkarshana (in 1996) Ed: J Jnanananda & Dr. Sanjeev K Shetty
 Baraha baagina (in 1997) Ed: H V Nagesh
 HamGranthavali (in 1997) (A compendium of his works) Ed: Smitha Reddy & Tamil Selvi
 Hampanā Vangmaya (in 2007) (Another compilation of his works) Ed: Dr. M Bhyregowa & B R Sathyanarayana
 Svasti (in 2010) Ed:Prof. Nalini Balbir, University of Paris

Awards
Hampanā is conferred with many awards. The latest is Naadoja Award (Teacher of the Land) conferred by Kannada University in 2006. The Acharya Sri Mahaprajna Jain Sahitya award, constituted by Jain Shwetambar Terapanth Sabha, was conferred on litterateur Dr. Hampa Nagarajaiah., consisting of a cash of Rs. 51,000 and a memento, on 13 July 2008.
Jain World Foundation USA has bestowed upon him the honor by awarding the prestigious ‘Jewel of Jain World’ award on Mahaveer Nirvana day of 2013. This award is given to selected few who have dedicated their life to serve the cause of Jainism and made significant contribution to propagate Jainism globally and enhance visibility of Jainism worldwide. Apart from this he is bestowed with Karnataka Sahitya Academy award in 1993–94, Janapada Yakshagana Academy award in 1995, National award for the best child literature in 1990, Chavundaraya award in 1996, Kavyananda award in 1997, Karnataka Rajyotsava award in 1998, Shasana Sahitya award and Chi Na Mangala awards in 2001, Sham Baa Joshi award in 2000.
Hampanā is felicitated by the monasteries like Nidumamidi Matha, Sringeri Matha, Chitradurga Brihanmatha, Savalagi Matha, Shravanabelagola Matha, Moorusavira Matha and Ilakal Mahantesha Matha for his contribution towards religion and literature. 
He is honoured with KundKund Gyanpeeth  award at Indore, Babulal Amrithlal Sha Gold Medal at Ahmedabad, Acharya Sumathi Sagar award from Sonagiri in Madhya Pradesh for his significant contribution to Jain literature. The civic societies of India and Shimoga have bestowed upon him the titles Sahitya Sindhu in 1997 and as Jnanabhaskara in 2001 respectively.
In 2016 Hampana was bestowed with the prestigious Pampa Prashasti instituted by the Government of Karnataka.
Recognising his contributions towards the classical Kannada he was chosen by the Human Resource Ministry of the Union Government of India to the honour of President’s certificate.

Charu Vasantha
Starting from Pampa, the Kannada literary world has seen many great epics. During the last one century it has seen a greatest number of epics. Among them are Sri Ramayana Darshanam of Kuvempu, Bharatha Sindhu Rashmi of Vinayaka Krishna Gokak, Bhavyamaanava of S. S. Bhoosnurmath. The poet Latha Rajashekhara has composed three epics on Jesus, Basava and Budha, a greatest achievement in one's lifetime.

Charu Vasantha is another great epic and is unique in its exposition in the history of Kannada literature. It is a romance story of Charu Datta a Jain mechant and Vasanta Tilake, the harlot with astounding beauty. He was jolted with his affluent property to her and lost the glory of his profession. However, he works hard and regains everything he had lost. Impressed by his hard labour, Vasanta Tilake marries him.
 
The caste and creed does not play any role in their union. Mitravati who is already leading a married life with Charudatta, wilfully accepts his marriage with Charu. Even his parents endorse this wedding. The story is folk type and characters appear befitting to it. This classic also emphasises the earthly flavours and also one’s final abode.
Hampana has knitted this present intricate but narrative theme in its desi style, which also H amalgamates the meters of Ragale, Champu, Shatpadi and alienated styles of prosody in Kannada. A few of the words which have become oblivion have been revived in this classic, denoting Hampana's linguistic erudition.
The roots of this fascinating chronicle are deep with their niche in early medieval poetry. The multidimensional multi-layered story has journeyed for over two millennia and finally found its rebirth in Charu Vasantha. The poem is radical and secular, with not a whiff of intolerance or hatred towards other religions or way of life.
It is interesting to note that this great work is translated to many other languages such as Rajasthani, Banjara, Telugu, Oriya, Bengali, Gujarati, Hindi, Kashmiri, Marathi, Prakrit, Punjabi, Sanskrit, Urdu and English.

On Kannada
Hampana’s scholarship in Kannada is most significantly depicted in his work called Spectrum of Classical Literature in Kannada which gives a sporadic illustration of Kannada language, culture and tradition in 5 volumes.
He is one among the very few who are proficient in Ancient form of Kannada, popularly known as Halagannada. He can speak in authority on Jainism and Jain Vastu. In his volume he emphasizes how the Jain epics influenced the growth of Kannada. With a proficiency in Kannada and Jainology, his mastery over English, Sanskrit and Prakrit made him recognized by the universities round the globe. 
Prof Hampana in his latest work Spectrum of Classical Literature in Karnataka-5 gives a sporadic illustration of the Kannada language and poetics.

References

1936 births
Kannada-language writers
Living people
People from Chikkaballapur district
University of Mysore alumni
Academic staff of the University of Mysore
Scholars of Jainism
20th-century Indian Jains
Writers from Karnataka
Bangalore University alumni
21st-century Indian Jains